Ray Sloan (born July 14, 1985) is an American mixed martial artist who last competed in Bellator's Light Heavyweight division.

Mixed martial arts career

Early career
Debuting in January 2013, Sloan spent his earlier career in the Xplode Fight Series promotion. By March 2014, he had compiled a 6–0 record with the promotion, with most of his victories ending via submission.

Bellator MMA
Sloan made his Bellator debut against Jamelle Jones at Bellator 121 on June 6, 2014. Sloan won the fight via rear-naked choke submission at 0:48 in the first round.

Sloan faced Nick Moghaddam at Bellator 127 on October 3, 2014. He won the fight via unanimous decision.

Mixed martial arts record

|-
| Loss
| align=center|8–1 
| Luc Bondale
| Decision (unanimous)
| Bellator 141
| 
| align=center| 3
| align=center| 5:00
| Temecula, California, United States
|
|-
|Win
|align=center|8–0
|Nick Moghaddam
|Decision (unanimous)
|Bellator 127
|
|align=center|3
|align=center|5:00
|Temecula, California, United States
|
|-
|Win
|align=center|7–0
|Jamelle Jones
|Submission (rear-naked choke)
|Bellator 121
|
|align=center|1
|align=center|0:48
|Thackerville, Oklahoma, United States
|
|-
|Win
|align=center|6–0
|Matt Lagler
|Decision (unanimous)
|Xplode Fight Series: Fire
|
|align=center|3
|align=center|5:00
|Valley Center, California, United States
|
|-
|Win
|align=center|5–0
|Mark McCaw
|Submission (rear-naked choke)
|Xplode Fight Series: Feast or Famine
|
|align=center|1
|align=center|1:25
|Valley Center, California, United States
|
|-
|Win
|align=center|4–0
|Josh Gibson
|Submission
|Xplode Fight Series: Creation
|
|align=center|1
|align=center|N/A
|Valley Center, California, United States
|
|-
|Win
|align=center|3–0
|Edward Darby
|Submission (armbar)
|Xplode Fight Series: Aftermath
|
|align=center|1
|align=center|2:11
|Valley Center, California, United States
|
|-
|Win
|align=center|2–0
|Cole Thomas
|Submission (guillotine choke)
|Xplode Fight Series: Revancha
|
|align=center|2
|align=center|2:27
|Valley Center, California, United States
|
|-
|Win
|align=center|1–0
|Pete Munoz
|Submission (rear-naked choke)
|Xplode Fight Series: Vengeance
|
|align=center|1
|align=center|0:46
|Valley Center, California, United States
|

References

Living people
1985 births
American male mixed martial artists
Light heavyweight mixed martial artists